Vincent Dillon was an Irish Dominican martyr, who died 1651.

Vincent Gerald Dillon was a native of Athenry who lived in London during the 1640s. He had formerly been a vicar at the Irish Dominican convent in Lisbon. He became a chaplain to the Irish royalist forces in during the Civil War in England. According to O'Reilly, he was taken prisoner by the rebels after the "Battle of York", possibly referring to the Battle of Marston Moor. He was kept in prison in York where he died of hardship and hunger about 1651.

References
 Irish Dominicans at Lisbon before 1700: a Biographical Register, Hugh Fenning, in Collectanea Hibernica, pp. 27–65 volume 42, 2000
 O'Reilly, Myles W.P.,Memorials of Those Who Suffered for the Catholic Faith in Ireland, 1889. Google books

People from County Galway
17th-century Irish Roman Catholic priests
Irish Dominicans
Irish military chaplains
English Civil War chaplains
1651 deaths
Year of birth unknown